The 2015–16 Iowa Hawkeyes men's basketball team represented the University of Iowa in the 2015–16 NCAA Division I men's basketball season. The team was led by sixth–year head coach Fran McCaffery and played their home games at Carver–Hawkeye Arena. They were members of the Big Ten Conference. They finished season 22–11, 12–6 record in Big Ten play to finish in a four-way tie for third place. In the Big Ten tournament, they were upset by Illinois in the second round. They received an at-large bid to the NCAA tournament where they defeated Temple in the first round before losing to eventual National Champion Villanova in the second round.

Previous season
The Hawkeyes finished the 2014–15 season with a 22–12 record, 12–6 in conference play finishing in third place. They lost to Penn State in the second round of the Big Ten tournament and received an at-large bid in the NCAA tournament where they defeated Davidson in the First Round and lost to Gonzaga in the Third Round.

Offseason

Departures

Incoming Transfers

2015 recruiting class

2016 Recruiting class

Roster

Schedule and results

|-
!colspan=9 style="background:#000000; color:#FFCC00;"| Exhibition

|-
!colspan=9 style="background:#000000; color:#FFCC00;"| Non-conference regular season

|-
!colspan=9 style="background:#000000; color:#FFCC00;"| Big Ten regular season

|-
!colspan=9 style="background:#000000; color:#FFCC00;"| Big Ten tournament

|-
!colspan=9 style="background:#000000; color:#FFCC00;"| NCAA tournament

Source:

Rankings

*AP does not release post-NCAA tournament rankings

See also
2015–16 Iowa Hawkeyes women's basketball team

References

Iowa
Iowa Hawkeyes men's basketball seasons
Iowa
Hawk
Hawk